The Middle Savage Islands are a group of islands, part of Canadian territory.

One of the Baffin Island offshore island groups, the Middle Savage Islands are located in Hudson Strait, southwest of Bond Inlet. They are part of the Qikiqtaaluk Region, in the Canadian territory of Nunavut.
 Saddleback Island is the largest member of the group.

References 

Archipelagoes of Baffin Island
Archipelagoes of the Canadian Arctic Archipelago
Islands of Hudson Strait
Uninhabited islands of Qikiqtaaluk Region